Synaesthesia (or synesthesia) is a perceptual experience.

Synaesthesia or Synaesthete may also refer to:

Music

Bands
Synæsthesia (Canadian band), an ambient music duo 1995–2001
Synaesthesia (English band), now known as Kyros, a rock and pop band

Albums
Synesthesia (Buck 65 album), 2001
Synesthesia (Chicago Underground Duo album), 2000
Synesthesia (Courage My Love album) or the title song, 2017
Synaesthesia (Kyros album), 2014
Synesthesia – I Think in Colours, by Alle Farben, or the title song, 2014
Without Words: Synesthesia, by Bethel Music, or the title song, 2015
Synaesthesia, by Andy Summers, 1995
Synesthesia, by Peter Himmelman, 1989

Songs
"Synesthesia" (song), by Andrew McMahon, 2013
"Synaesthesia", by the Thrillseekers, 1999

Other uses
Synaesthesia (rhetorical device), in literature, when one sense is described in terms of another
Synaesthete (video game), a 2007 freeware music game
Synesthesia Mandala Drums, a brand of electronic drum pads
Synesthesia, a 2005 film featuring Masanobu Ando
Detective Wanda "Synaesthesia" Jackson, a character from Top 10